Louis Butler (born 26 August 2001) is an Australian rules footballer who plays for the Western Bulldogs in the Australian Football League (AFL). He was recruited by the Western Bulldogs with the 53rd draft pick in the 2019 AFL draft.

Early football
Butler played for, and captained his side at Brighton Grammar School. He also played for the Sandringham Dragons in the NAB League, and was selected to play for Vic Metro in the AFL Under 18 Championships.

AFL career
Butler debuted in the 4th round of the 2020 AFL season, against the Sydney Swans. In his first game, he picked up 14 disposals.

Statistics
Statistics are correct to the 2020 season 

|- style="background:#EAEAEA"
| scope="row" text-align:center | 2020
| 
| 18 || 2 || 0 || 1 || 24 || 6 || 30 || 6 || 1 || 0.0 || 0.5 || 12.0 || 3.0 || 15.0 || 3.0 || 0.5
|- class=sortbottom
! colspan=3 | Career
! 2 !! 0 !! 1 !! 24 !! 6 !! 30 !! 6 !! 1 !! 0.0 !! 0.5 !! 12.0 !! 3.0 !! 15.0 !! 3.0 !! 0.5
|}

References

External links

2001 births
Living people
Western Bulldogs players
Australian rules footballers from Melbourne
People educated at Brighton Grammar School